Ever Alexis Caballero (born 27 April 1982 in Asunción, Paraguay) is a Paraguayan footballer who plays as a goalkeeper.

Teams
  Olimpia 2002–2004
  Querétaro 2005
  Bolívar 2005–2006
  The Strongest 2006
  Sportivo Luqueño 2006–2007
  12 de Octubre 2008
  Olimpia 2008–2009
  2 de Mayo 2009
  Nacional 2010
  Deportes Copiapó 2011
  Sportivo Luqueño 2012–2013
  Olimpia 2014–2016
  Guaraní 2016–present

Titles
  Sportivo Luqueño 2007 (Torneo Apertura)
  Olimpia 2002 (Copa Libertadores)

External links
 

1982 births
Living people
Paraguayan footballers
Paraguayan expatriate footballers
Paraguay international footballers
Club Guaraní players
Club Olimpia footballers
Club Nacional footballers
12 de Octubre Football Club players
2 de Mayo footballers
Sportivo Luqueño players
Querétaro F.C. footballers
Club Bolívar players
The Strongest players
Deportes Copiapó footballers
Expatriate footballers in Chile
Expatriate footballers in Mexico
Expatriate footballers in Bolivia
Association football goalkeepers